Chinnaganjam is a Mandal in Bapatla district of the Indian state of Andhra Pradesh. It is the mandal headquarters of Chinnaganjam mandal in Chirala revenue division.

Geography 

References 

Villages in Prakasam district
Mandal headquarters in Prakasam district